J. R. R. Tolkien invented heraldic devices for many of the characters and nations of Middle-earth. His descriptions were in simple English rather than in specific blazon. The emblems correspond in nature to their bearers, and their diversity contributes to the richly-detailed realism of his writings.

Scholars note that Tolkien went through different phases in his use of heraldry; his early account of the Elvish heraldry of Gondolin in The Book of Lost Tales corresponds broadly to heraldic tradition in the choice of emblems and colours, but that later when he wrote The Lord of the Rings he was freer in his approach, and in the complex use of symbols for Aragorn's sword and banner, he clearly departs from tradition to suit his storytelling.

In his The Lord of the Rings film trilogy, Peter Jackson and his concept designers took inspiration from traditional representations of men-at-arms on horseback with banners and armour, especially Albrecht Altdorfer's 1529 oil painting, The Battle of Alexander at Issus, to create realistic battle scenes.

Overview 

The scholar of English Jamie McGregor writes that the heraldic emblems described by J. R. R. Tolkien are associated with symbols used in The Lord of the Rings; some are readily apparent to the reader, such as the "Evil Eye" used by the Dark Lord Sauron, while others need closer analysis to reveal their significance. He comments that first-time readers may notice the descriptions of emblems simply as part of the rich detailing of Middle-earth, but that closer attention reveals an accurate match between the symbols and the "histories and cultures, the allegiances, characters and natures, of those who bear them".

Margaret R. Purdy, writing in Mythlore, states that the Elvish emblems (as opposed to those used by Men in The Silmarillion), use rules similar to European heraldry, but with more freedom, for example in the use of colour. She notes that there are some puzzles, as with the emblem of Finwë, a winged sun: since the sun had not been created when he lived, the emblem must have been devised posthumously, just as medieval heralds created arms for the first man, Adam. 

Catalin Hriban comments that although Tolkien makes only light use of heraldry, he transformed it "into a mythographer's tool and artifice, like all the rest of [the] primary-world cultural items that are woven into the Tolkienian cosmos". He adds that "the heraldic rules and visual canon are treated with the same philologist's care as the vocabulary and grammar rules of his created languages". 

Hriban states that in The Hobbit, written for children, the banners are simplified to plain colours. Tolkien uses green for the Wood-Elves, blue for the Men of Lake-town (Esgaroth) on the good side; red and black for the goblins or Orcs of the bad side. Hriban notes that Tolkien continues the association of these colours with good and evil into The Lord of the Rings.

J. R. R. Tolkien

Rules of Elvish heraldry

The Tolkien scholars Wayne G. Hammond and Christina Scull describe Tolkien's graphic creativity, from doodles to Númenórean artefacts and Elvish emblems. Tolkien noted the rules of Elvish heraldry:

One of Tolkien's drawings of emblems, for Lúthien Tinúviel, was used on the front cover of The Silmarillion, and another five (for Fingolfin, Eärendil, Idril Celebrindal, Elwë, and Fëanor) were used on the back cover.

Houses of Gondolin 

According to The Book of Lost Tales, the active male Elves of Gondolin, a city in Beleriand in the First Age, belonged to one of the 11 "Houses" or Thlim, plus the bodyguard of Tuor, a Man, which was accounted the twelfth. Each house had a distinct symbol: a mole, a swallow, the heavens, a pillar, a tower of snow, a tree, a golden flower, a fountain, a harp, a hammer and anvil, and finally the triple symbol of the King, namely the moon, sun, and scarlet heart worn by the Royal Guard. 

Hriban writes that the Gondolin emblems are simply figurative, depicting familiar objects, and that similar devices can be found in standard British texts on heraldry. He notes that Maeglin the traitor, of the House of Moles, fittingly has the colour black; like the animal, his people are miners, used to living underground in the dark.

Maiar

Men 

Hriban writes that in Tolkien's third heraldic phase, writing The Lord of the Rings, his choice of imagery is personal rather than canonical heraldry, suiting the demands of the narrative. Thus, Aragorn's motifs go beyond the heraldic canon; they are assembled in a "multilayered iconography" that symbolises the reunification of the Kingdoms of Arnor and Gondor: his sword, Andúril, is "forged anew" (itself a symbolic action, he observes) with "a device of seven stars set between the crescent Moon and the rayed Sun"; he glosses the stars as Elendil's, the Sun as perhaps Anarion's, and the Moon as presumably Isildur's.

Peter Jackson 

In his The Lord of the Rings film trilogy, Peter Jackson and his concept designers took inspiration from traditional representations of men-at-arms on horseback with banners and armour. Jackson mentioned in particular Albrecht Altdorfer's 1529 oil painting, The Battle of Alexander at Issus, depicting the events of 333 BC. Jackson personally drove this realistic approach, saying: "Imagine this: 7,000 years has gone by... Rohan heraldry is studied and faithfully reproduced. Théoden's original saddle is in a museum – far too valuable to use in the movie, but an exact copy is made". Richard Taylor, creative director of Weta Workshop, responsible for manufacturing weapons and equipment, stated that he insisted on "invest[ing] the props with a high level of richness and heraldry and realism".

See also 

 Tolkien's artwork#The Silmarillion

Notes

References

Primary 
This list identifies each item's location in Tolkien's writings.

Secondary

Sources 

 
 
 
 
    
      
    
    
   
 

Middle-earth
Themes of The Lord of the Rings